József Kiss (29 April 1909 – 5 September 1986) was a Hungarian long-distance runner. He competed in the marathon at the 1948 Summer Olympics in London, and finished 19th overall with a time of 2:50:20.0.

References

External links
 

1909 births
1986 deaths
Athletes (track and field) at the 1948 Summer Olympics
Hungarian male long-distance runners
Hungarian male marathon runners
Olympic athletes of Hungary
People from Salgótarján
Sportspeople from Nógrád County
20th-century Hungarian people